PTC Coconuts was a Cook Islands football club located in Rarotonga, Cook Islands. It played in Cook Islands Round Cup the main football league competition in 1995, which they won.

Titles
Cook Islands Round Cup: 1
1995

References

Football clubs in the Cook Islands